Valence-Ville station (French: Gare de Valence-Ville) is a railway station serving the town Valence, Drôme department, southeastern France. It is situated on the Paris–Marseille railway, and is the southern terminus of a branch line to Grenoble.

The station is owned and operated by the SNCF and served by both TGV and TER Auvergne-Rhône-Alpes trains.

Services

The station is served by regional trains to Lyon, Avignon and Grenoble, and a few high speed trains.

References

External links

Railway stations in Auvergne-Rhône-Alpes
Railway stations in France opened in 1865